The Ivan Susanin class is a type of icebreaking patrol ships operated by the Russian Navy and the FSB Border Service. The Soviet designation is Project 97P. The ships are also known as the Aysberg-class patrol icebreakers.

Design

These ships are modified versions of the Project 97 icebreakers. They are armed with a twin   gun mounting forward and two 30 mm  close-in weapon systems aft as well as having a helipad and surveillance radar. The twin 76 mm  gun are controlled by  Turel ("Hawk Screech") fire-control radar. On the Soviet Navy icebreaking patrol vessels Ivan Susanin and Ruslan armament was removed.

Ships
Eight ships were built between 1972 and 1981 by the Admiralty Shipyard in Leningrad. Four have been retired and four remain operational as of 2018.

See also
 List of ships of the Soviet Navy
 List of ships of Russia by project number
 List of NATO reporting names for equipment
 List of Soviet navy flags
 List of Russian navy flags

References

Bibliography
  Also published as

External links

  Warships.ru
  Hazegray.org
  All Ivan Susanin class icebreakers - Complete Ship List

Corvette classes
Corvettes of the Soviet Navy
Corvettes of the Border Guard Service of Russia
Icebreakers of the Soviet Union
Auxiliary icebreaker classes